This article lists a few selected examples of hill forts in Scotland. The remains of at least 1,695 hillforts have been counted throughout the country as a whole, most predominantly on the Scottish mainland, and also including on some of the Scottish islands. One of the highest concentrations of historic hillforts in Europe, according to the Trimontium Trust, is in the Scottish Borders, including particularly in the historic county of Berwickshire. Hill forts in Scotland typically date from the Bronze and Iron Ages, but post-Roman inhabitation of many sites is also important. The remains today typically survive only as earthworks with occasional traces of structural stone in varying quantity. Remains of vitrified forts are also found throughout Scotland.



Aberdeenshire
 Bennachie
 Dunnicaer
 Dunnideer
 Tap o' Noth

Angus
The Caterthuns

Argyll and Bute
 An Caisteal, Coll
 Dùn Cholla, Colonsay
 Dùn Dubh, Coll
 Dùn Eibhinn, Colonsay
 Dùn Meadhonach, Colonsay
 Dùn Morbhaidh, Coll
 Dunadd, Argyll
 Dun Skeig, Kintyre
 The Doon (Drumadoon), Arran

Clackmannanshire

Dumfries and Galloway
 Doon of May
 Grennan Hill
 Tynron Doon

East Lothian
 Black Castle
 Blackcastle Hill
 Chesters Hill Fort (Historic Scotland)
 Kae Heughs, near Haddington
 Kidlaw, near Dalkeith
 Traprain Law 
 White Castle

City of Edinburgh
 Arthur's Seat
 Blackford Hill

Fife
 Clatchard Craig
 Norman's Law

Highland
 Dunearn
 Dun Cruinn
 Dun Evan
 Dun Ringill
 Dun Skudiburgh
 Craig Phadrig, Inverness

Midlothian
 Castle Law

Moray
 Cluny Hill
 Doune of Relugas
 Knock of Alves

Perth and Kinross
 Moredun Top hill fort, Moncreiffe Hill
 Dundurn

Scottish Borders
According to the Trimontium Trust, the area of the Scottish Borders lays claim to as many as 408 identifiable hillfort sites, one of the highest concentrations in Europe.

 Addinston
 Black Meldon
 Broxmouth (destroyed)
 Bunkle Edge (Drakemire hillforts) series of linked hillforts running along a ridge north of the B6438 from Reston to Preston
 Chester Hill, Burnmouth
 Cockburn Law
 Colud's Fort, Kirk Hill (Colodaesburg), St Abb’s Head
 Duns Law ("Covenanter’s Camp"), Duns
 Earns Heugh
 Edin's Hall Broch (Historic Scotland)
 Eildon Hill
 Fosterland Burn
 Gordon Castle, Bogle Plantation, Gordon
 Habchester, Bastleridge
 Hirsel Law
 Milkieston Rings
 Mutiny Stones
 Northshield Rings
 Peniel Heugh
 Primrose Hill Fort
 Raecleugh Head
 Tollis Hill
 White Meldon

South Lanarkshire
 Black Hill (National Trust for Scotland)

Stirling
 Castle Law, Dumyat
 Gillies Hill

West Dunbartonshire
 Dumbarton Rock

West Lothian
 Bowden Hill, near Linlithgow
 Castlethorn, or Canniewell Slack, Torphichen
 Cockleroy
 Dechmont Law, possible hill fort remains
 Peace Knowe, by Ochiltree

Western Isles
 Dùn Èistean

See also
 David Christison
 List of castles in Scotland
 Hillforts in Scotland
 Hillforts in Britain
 Hillfort of Otzenhausen
 List of hillforts on the Isle of Man
 List of hillforts in Northern Ireland
 List of hillforts in Ireland
 List of hillforts in Wales
 List of hillforts in Monmouthshire
 List of hillforts in England
 List of hillforts and ancient settlements in Somerset
 Forts in Cornwall
 List of hillforts in Latvia

References

External links

 West Lothian Archaeology Group, aerial photography of a number of hill forts in West Lothian
Hillforts Atlas Project – a crowd-sourced project to map the hillforts of Britain and Ireland

Hill forts in Scotland
 
Scotland